Osbornia is a genus of tropiduchid planthoppers in the family Tropiduchidae. There are at least two described species in Osbornia.

Species
These two species belong to the genus Osbornia:
 Osbornia arborea Ball, 1935 i c g b
 Osbornia cornuta Ball, 1910 i c g b
Data sources: i = ITIS, c = Catalogue of Life, g = GBIF, b = Bugguide.net

References

Further reading

 
 
 
 
 
 

Auchenorrhyncha genera
Elicini